The United Remnant Band of the Shawnee Nation (also called the Shawnee Nation, URB) is an unrecognized tribe located in Ohio who claims descent from the historic Shawnee before that Native American people's removal to Indian Territory (now Oklahoma). 

Three federally recognized tribes of Shawnee are based in Oklahoma.

Despite using the word nation in its name, the group is neither a federally recognized tribe nor a state-recognized tribe. Ohio has no office to manage Indian affairs and no state-recognized tribes.

The Ohio state legislature passed a 1979 joint resolution of the United Remnant Band, but the legal status of that resolution has been disputed. Thirty-five groups in Ohio claim to have Shawnee descent, such as the Vinyard Indian Settlement, but "Ohio has no state recognized tribes nor does it have a recognition process," wrote Mary Annette Pember (Red Cliff Ojibwe.

History
Prior to 1831, the Shawnee were relocated, band by band, to Missouri, Kansas, Oklahoma, and other parts of the American Plains west of the Mississippi River as a number of Shawnee chiefs surrendered independently to the United States. Chief Black Hoof (Catahecassa, d. 1831) signed the 1817 Treaty of Fort Meigs and 1818 Treaty of St. Mary's, which ceded lands and created small reservations for the Shawnee. The Wapakoneta Shawnee, who followed Black Hoof, were removed to Kansas after his death in 1831. They signed the 1831 Treaty of Wapakoneta.

In 1971, at a time of Indian activism across the United States, Shawnee people in Ohio organized the United Remnant Band of the Shawnee Nation as a 501(C)(3) nonprofit organization. In the latter part of the decade, the band filed historic and genealogical documents with the state to support their claim of descent from the historical Shawnee. The Ohio General Assembly held hearings and heard testimony from numerous groups. This legislature passed a joint resolution in 1979-1980 recognizing the United Remnant Band as an Indian tribe descended from the historic Shawnee and as Ohio's only state recognized tribe. The URB acknowledges that it is not a federally recognized tribe but points to this resolution as evidence of current state recognition.

In 1989 the URB purchased 20 acres of land, three miles (6.4 km) south of Urbana, Ohio. According to the late Chief Hawk Pope, this was the only "tribally held piece of land" in Ohio since 1830. In 1995 the URB purchased the Zane Caverns between Zanesfield and Bellefontaine, Ohio and an associated museum. In total they have bought 330 acres in four counties, both to aid their economic development and to create communal holdings for future generations.

The  campground, museum, gift shop, caverns, and surrounding property were renamed as the Zane Shawnee Caverns and Southwind Park. They have enlarged the museum in Bellefontaine, renaming it as the George Drouillard Museum. It is devoted to the Shawnee-French man who was interpreter and hunter for the Lewis and Clark Expedition (1804-1806).

Government
The Shawnee Nation, URB has an elected form of government, with council members and a chief. Until his death in 2015, the chief was Jerry L. "Hawk" Pope, who led for more than 40 years. Geah (Nightwind) has the position of Mother of the Nation. Both men and women may be elected to the inner council.

Membership
The Shawnee Nation, URB says the organization requires people to trace their lineage and document at least one-eighth Shawnee ancestry (the equivalent of one great-grandparent), or one-16th if the person is a child "of a provable person."

Indian gaming
In 2003 the Ohio legislature debated authorizing video slots at racetracks in the state, a move that would establish Class III gaming. With the state having established that level of gaming, under federal law, federally recognized Native American tribes would be able to negotiate with the state to establish gaming casinos as well, although no federally recognized tribe held sovereign land in the state to use as a base for such a casino. Lacking federal recognition, the Shawnee United Remnant Band cannot participate in such development and wants no part in it.

Economic development
In 1989 the organization purchased 110 acres near Urbana, Ohio. To generate revenue for welfare and development, they purchased the Zane Shawnee Caverns in 1996 and a museum. The latter is now named for and devoted to George Drouillard, a Shawnee interpreter and hunter who was a member of Lewis and Clark's Corps of Discovery.

The US Mint contracted with the United Remnant Band to sew pouches for the 2004 US Mint Lewis and Clark Coin but was informed by the Indian Arts and Crafts Board that "the Shawnee Nation United Remnant Band of Ohio does not meet the legal requirements to produce and market authentic 'Indian' products under the Indian Arts and Crafts Act." The US mint refunded money spent on the pouches.

References

External links
Shawnee Nation, United Remnant Band, official website

1971 establishments in Ohio
Allen County, Ohio
Auglaize County, Ohio
History of Ohio
Lima, Ohio
Logan County, Ohio
Unrecognized tribes in the United States
Shawnee heritage groups